Tara Platt (born June 18, 1978) is an American actress and author who has provided voices for dozens of English-language versions of Japanese anime films, television series and video games. Her notable roles in anime include Temari in Naruto and Reina in Rave Master. She also voices Kali Belladonna in RWBY, Mitsuru Kirijo in Persona 3, Edelgard von Hresvelg in Fire Emblem: Three Houses, Miriel & Flavia in Fire Emblem: Awakening, Anna Williams from the Tekken series, as well as characters in Mortal Kombat vs. DC Universe, Ultimate Marvel vs. Capcom 3, Saints Row: The Third, Bayonetta 2, Soulcalibur IV, League of Legends, and Yuri Watanabe in Spider-Man.

Early life 

Platt moved around a lot when she was young, and her family settled in Chelsea, Michigan when she was 14. She went to Rutgers University's Mason Gross School of the Arts in New Brunswick, New Jersey, where she earned her Bachelor of Fine Arts in theatre arts in 1999. She also studied at the London Academy of Theatre. She lived in New York and worked off-Broadway, and later moved to Los Angeles.

Career 
On screen, Platt has appeared in television shows like Scandal, Hawaii Five-0, Castle and Revenge, as well as the feature film The Call.  Platt has also performed in shows written and directed by John de Lancie. She played Juliet in Romeo and Juliet (with both the Pasadena Civic and the Toyota Youth Shakespeare Series with the Los Angeles Philharmonic); Titania in A Midsummer Night's Dream; Katherine in The Taming of the Shrew; and appeared in First Nights: Clara and Robert Schumann at the Walt Disney Concert Hall as Clara Schumann, in a role written for her by de Lancie.

In 2004, Platt and husband Yuri Lowenthal founded Monkey Kingdom Productions, an independent film production company which has produced two feature films including Lowenthal's Tumbling After, and mockumentary Con Artists. They also created a live-action web-series Shelf Life about a group of superhero figurines; the series ran for four seasons on YouTube. Their comedy series Whatta Lark garnered seven IAWTV nominations and won Best Male Performer in a Comedy for lead actor Christopher Graham.

In 2018, Platt and Lowenthal were asked to give a TEDx Talk for TEDxUCSD for the May 2018 TEDx Conference: When Bubbles Burst. Their topic was Your Life Story: Using Story Structure to Navigate Crisis.

Platt and Lowenthal co-authored a book called Voice-Over Voice Actor: What It's Like Behind the Mic and follow up Voice-Over Voice Actor: The Extended Edition, which gives tips and information for aspiring voice actors. Platt also has authored several other books including kids' bedtime book Relax Your Toes, an interactive journal of a traveling Romani girl Zartana, and dystopian YA novel Prep School for Serial Killers.

Personal life 

Platt and fellow voice actor Yuri Lowenthal married in Las Vegas on New Year's Eve in 2001. They have one son, born in 2016.

Filmography

Voice roles

Anime

Animation

Films

Video games

Live-action roles

Television

Film

Web series

Books

Notes

References

External links 

 
 
 
 
 

1978 births
Living people
Actresses from Los Angeles
Actresses from Michigan
Actresses from New York City
Actresses from Virginia
Actors from Fairfax, Virginia
American film actresses
American television actresses
American video game actresses
American voice actresses
American web series actresses
American people of Mongolian descent
Businesspeople from New York City
Mason Gross School of the Arts alumni
Place of birth missing (living people)
People from Chelsea, Michigan
Rutgers University alumni
Web series producers
21st-century American actresses
20th-century American actresses